Yohana Cobo (born 12 January 1985) is a Spanish actress who began her career as a child actress. She is best known for her role in the film Volver (2006), which earned her a Cannes Film Festival Award for Best Actress.

Filmography

Films
1997 - Campeones
2000 - Aunque tú no lo sepas
2001 - Sin noticias de Dios
2002 - Semana santa
2003 - La vida mancha (Life Marks)
2004 - Las Llaves de la independencia
2004 - El Séptimo día
2004 - Seres queridos
2005 - Fin de curso 
2006 - Volver
2006 - Arena en los bolsillos (post-production)
2009 - Tramontana'

Television
 El Comisario ("La Casa de las meriendas"; 2005)
 Código fuego ("Despedidas"; 2003)
 Hospital Central ("Decisiones"; 2002) 
 Hermanas (1998–99)

Awards
Cannes Film Festival - 2006 Best Actress together with the rest of the female cast of Volver''.

References

External links

1985 births
Living people
Spanish film actresses
Spanish television actresses
Actresses from Madrid
Cannes Film Festival Award for Best Actress winners